The PLW Heavyweight Championship is a professional wrestling heavyweight championship in Power League Wrestling (PLW). It is the top championship of the PLW promotion, and one of two singles titles along with the PLW New England Championship. The inaugural champion was "The Fighter" Joe O., who defeated The Shadow Warrior in a tournament final on November 18, 1991, to become the first PLW Heavyweight Champion. Scott Z. holds the record for most reigns, with four. At 1,239 days, "Punisher" Don Vega's first and only reign is the longest in the title's history. Gino Martino's only reign was the shortest in the history of the title as he gave the belt to manager Scott Knight immediately after winning it. Overall, there have been 36 reigns shared between 27 wrestlers with nine vacancies.

Title history
Key

Reigns
As of January 1, 2016

List of combined reigns

References
General

Specific

External links
PowerLeagueWrestling.com
PLW Heavyweight Championship at Cagematch.net
PLW Heavyweight Championship at Wrestlingdata.com

Heavyweight wrestling championships